Buy Now, Die Later (formerly Death and Senses) is a 2015 Filipino supernatural psychological horror suspense film directed by Randolph Longjas starring Vhong Navarro, Alex Gonzaga, Rayver Cruz, John Lapus, Lotlot de Leon, TJ Trinidad and Janine Gutierrez. It is an official entry to the 2015 Metro Manila Film Festival.

The film is about a compendium of five interrelated stories brought together by the proprietor of a curio shop selling unusual items. Santi (portrayed by TJ Trinidad), who says the role is "kind of demonic". Each of the character's story is weaved around the five senses – sense of sight, hearing, smell, touch and taste.

The film's official trailer was released on December 4, 2015.

Plot

"Masid" (Sight) 
The story starts with Odie (Vhong Navarro), a photojournalist. He is a desperate vlogger who wants to be as famous as his father, who was a renowned photographer. After failing to get the controversial picture of a congressman and his mistress Natasha, his boss gives him an ultimatum that if he fails to submit a picture, he will be fired.

He confides his problem to his best friend Ato (Rayver Cruz), who is a successful owner of a restaurant. Odie walks by himself and comes across an antique shop he had never seen before. He goes in and is greeted by Santi (TJ Trinidad), the eccentric owner of the antique shop. Odie's attention is caught when he sees a portrait of a beautiful woman which he recognized was the work of his late father. He offers him a camera that will solve all of his problems, but in return, he had to sign a contract that states:

 He should never tell anyone about the store;
 He should take good care of the camera and not destroy it; and 
 He should only take pictures if deemed necessary.

A slash on his hands soon appear.

Odie reached the peak of his career when Natasha, the congressman's mistress is found by Odie himself, dead in a car. He takes pictures and uploads it to his vlog, gaining him his wanted fame. Then the congressman soon dies, escalating his fame even more when he also found the body. Odie felt guilt when he realizes the happenings are not normal.

His camera then reveals another victim and Odie attempts to save the next life. He goes to a parking space where he believes the next victim would be. He is then struck in the back by Chloe Narciso (Alex Gonzaga). Odie grabs the blunt object from her. He then realized that all along, the camera has been possessing him and he was the one who killed Natasha and the congressman. Odie turns violent and started to move towards Chloe. In fright, Chloe attempts to escape only to be run over by a car.

"Dinig" (Hearing) 
The scene then jumps to Chloe walking into a talk show. Chloe is a well-known singer who was pushed to fame by her ambitious mother Maita (Lotlot de Leon). Before her fame, she was really a frustrated and terrible singer. Maita then told her to "visit" someone she knew who could help her. The two then went to Santi's shop and asked for his help. Santi offered Chloe a phone which will make her famous and grant all her wishes, but she was asked to sign a contract that states:

 She must never tell anyone about the store;
 She must take care of the phone and not destroy it; and 
 She must not answer any messages unknown to her.

As with Odie, a slash then appeared on her hands.

One night, Chloe attempted to record herself playing the guitar while singing. As she knew was really terrible at doing so, she decided to watch the whole video; to her surprise, she sounded amazing. This led to her being one of the most recognized singers in town. Some time later, what seemed to be a virtual assistant mobile app popped into her screen, and it started asking Chloe questions that were impossible to be said by a mere app. She started talking to it like a real person and it always tells her everything about everyone.

When a blind item rumor against Chloe spread all over the internet, the app warned her that it was done by her friends, one of which included Natasha (the congressman's mistress), whom she confronted in a restaurant. The app asked Chloe what she wants to do, and wished Natasha dead. Natasha, in reality was killed when a vlogger (Odie) revealed it in his website.

After telling her story, Chloe breaks down and the talk show was forced to cut. Suddenly, the voice of the app began bothering her again. She runs to her dressing room and was followed by Maita. The two have a heated argument when Chloe told her she destroyed the phone; Maita walks out. To Chloe's fright, the phone came back, good as new, and threatens Chloe that it would victimize her mother next. Chloe runs out of the dressing and into the parking lot where she was confronted by someone before being run over by a car.

"Sarap" (Taste) 
Ato is then seen in front of a Gothic-looking house, delivering food from his restaurant. It was raining hard and he is bothered by the odd behavior of the family. When he was forced to stay due to the bad weather, he seemed more and more uncomfortable. The family was speaking about cannibalism. When the patriarch (Jason Gainza) arrived home, he asked Ato to help him carry a body bag inside the house. Reluctant and frightened about it, he goes along. He felt relieved and relaxed when the body bag contained a roasted pig.

He realized that the family's youngest member was having a horror-themed birthday party, hence the creepiness he had felt. When the family started to eat the cake Ato made and delivered, they all felt sick and began to vomit, eventually dying.

It was revealed that Ato deliberately poisoned them. Before he was a successful restaurant owner, he consulted Santi for help. Santi gave him a small handbook with potion recipes, but he needed to sign a contract stating that:

 He must never tell anyone about the store;
 He must take good care of the book and not destroy it; and
 He must follow the recipes exactly as they are.

As with those before him, a slash appeared on his hands.

He spiked the cake with poison, killing the family. The secret of his restaurant success was that he uses human meat to serve his customers, adding concoctions from his book to make it extra special.

"Halimuyak" (Smell) 
The scene jumps to a gay man named Pippa (John Lapus) on an eyeball date with a good-looking man (Markki Stroem). Realizing Pipa was gay, he left him in rage. Pippa became really conscious about how he looks and was always teased by men for him being a homosexual. He also ends up jealous with his sister Larra (Cai Cortez) when Pippa's childhood crush Aldo (Manuel Chua) harbors feelings for her.

One night, Pippa is accosted by drunk men. He comes across Santi's shop, who offers to help him. He gives him a bottle of perfume that will make him attractive to all men, but he needed to sign a contract with the following terms that:

 He must never tell anyone about the store;
 He must take good care of the bottle and never destroy it; and
 He must have one spray per day and never exceed.

Every day, Pippa is chased through town by handsome men. One day, he goes to a restaurant to meet with the Chloe Narciso Fans Club. Pippa then sees Ato (his high school classmate) talking to Odie about something important. Pippa then spots Maita in the restaurant with Chloe, confronting Natasha. As a big fan, Pippa asked Maita if he can have Chloe's autograph, to which Maita gladly obliged.

As time runs by, Pippa becomes abusive with his perfume, taking more than one spray a day, and has an army of men as slaves. Larra becomes worried about her brother. When Larra and Aldo (along with his other male friends) went out for the night, Pippa confronted them and poured all the perfume on himself; the men then became voracious zombies and chased Pippa all around town. He was then cornered as dozens of zombies surrounded him.

"Kanti" (Touch) 
After Maita and Chloe's fight in the dressing room, Maita went back to Santi's shop and asked him to help Chloe be herself again. Santi rebuffed her pleas and instead handed her an age-reversing cream, implying that what Maita really wanted was to be beautiful again. She was asked to sign a contract that says:

 She must never tell anyone about the store;
 She must take good care of the cream and never destroy it; and 
 She must not overuse it.

It was revealed that Maita was the beautiful lady in the portrait Odie saw earlier. Her fame stopped when she was raped, with Chloe as the child. Maita (Janine Gutierrez), now looking young and beautiful, ventured into a bar to attempt reconciling with Chloe. She was helped in by the man whom Pippa was seen with earlier. She completely forgets about Chloe and started to party hard.

Suddenly, bugs began bothering her skin. In fright, she ran out of the bar but was stopped by the good-looking man and started to sexually assault her. At the parking area, Odie came to his senses and started to look for Chloe. He saw her unconscious body on the floor and shouted at the car driver to help him get Chloe to the hospital. The driver was revealed to be Ato, who is determined to make Chloe his next course in the restaurant. Ato points a gun at Odie and before he could kill him, a weakly Chloe bludgeons Ato unconscious. Odie then accompanies Chloe to the hospital to treat her injuries.

Meanwhile, Pippa was still being chased by the undead men, but he comes across a dumpster. He dives in the dumpster to hide his smell from the perfume. As the zombies began to retreat, Pippa spots Maita being molested. He saves Maita from the man and the two recognized each other, having previously met at the restaurant. Pippa and Maita then go to the hospital and came across Odie and Chloe. Realizing they were all cursed by Santi, they decided to finish it once and for all.

Odie concluded that if they exchange their respective products from Santi's shop, they will be able to destroy it without harm. Odie gave Chloe his camera and she gave him her cellphone. Maita gave Pippa her cream and Pippa gave her his perfume. The four confronted Santi when Ato also arrived still with his violent approach. Santi then put them all into a trance as he revealed himself to be the Devil and revealed that their lives are payment for the products they bought. Ato, not being a part of Odie's plan, was killed by Santi. Chloe was threatened by Santi but before he could kill her, Chloe destroyed the camera. Her ears soon bleed. Pippa was almost killed by Santi when he impersonated his sister Larra but Pippa destroyed Maita's cream and escaped. Maita was then surrounded by thousands and thousands of bugs but was able to destroy Pippa's perfume allowing her to escape as well. Odie was confronted by Santi. He was able to smash Chloe's phone before being stabbed in the eye.

In the real world, Chloe became deaf, Odie became blind and Pippa became sensitive to smell. They destroyed the remaining things of Santi and Maita sacrificed herself to burn the contracts and the store. Maita and Santi were then killed in the fire.

Sometime later, Chloe, now deaf, was in a press conference, with Pippa being her translator. After the conference, they met with a blind Odie. As the three boarded Chloe's van, Santi, who was revealed to be still alive, was seen in front of his closed store selling a new batch of items to a new batch of people.

Cast

"Masid" (Sight) 

Vhong Navarro as Odie
Rayver Cruz as Ato
Alex Gonzaga as Chloe Narciso
TJ Trinidad as Santi

"Dinig" (Hearing) 
Heaven Peralejo as Cesca
Lotlot de Leon as Maita

"Sarap" (Taste)
Jason Gainza as Patriarch

"Halimuyak" (Smell) 
John Lapus as Pippa
Markki Stroem as the good-looking guy
Cai Cortez as Larra
Manuel Chua as Aldo

"Kanti" (Touch) 
Janine Gutierrez as Young Maita

Awards

See also
 List of ghost films
 Veronilca Decides To Die

References

External links
 

2015 films
2015 horror films
2015 comedy films
Philippine supernatural horror films
Philippine psychological horror films
Philippine psychological thriller films
Philippine comedy horror films
Witchcraft in Philippine films
Magic realism films
2010s psychological horror films
2015 psychological thriller films
2010s supernatural films
2010s English-language films